Dinesh Prasad Goala (1947–2014) was an Indian Politician and former MLA of Lakhipur, representing INC for 7 consecutive terms (1983–2014) until his death. He also served as  Minister in-charge of Power & Public Health Engineering Dept., Assam   (1991-2006). Dinesh died on 11 April 2014. He also lived in Binnakandi Ghat.

Education
Goala earned his MA in Political Science from Gauhati University in 1971.

References

Assam politicians
1947 births
2014 deaths
Assam MLAs 1983–1985
Assam MLAs 1985–1991
Assam MLAs 1991–1996
Assam MLAs 1996–2001
Assam MLAs 2001–2006
Assam MLAs 2006–2011
Assam MLAs 2011–2016
Indian National Congress politicians from Assam